Édouard Fraisse (14 May 1880 – 13 September 1945) was a French sculptor. His work was part of the art competitions at the 1924 Summer Olympics, the 1928 Summer Olympics, and the 1932 Summer Olympics.

References

1880 births
1945 deaths
19th-century French sculptors
20th-century French sculptors
French male sculptors
Olympic competitors in art competitions
People from Beaune
19th-century French male artists